Ball & Chain is a 2004 romantic comedy written by Thomas Mortimer. It was directed by Shiraz Jafri and produced by A. V. T. Shankardass. It stars Sunil Malhotra, Lisa Ray, Kal Penn, Purva Bedi and Asrani. It was filmed on location in Austin, Texas. It was released by Lions Gate Entertainment.

Plot 
Somewhere in the middle of Texas, Ameet (Sunil Malhotra) and Saima (Lisa Ray) have a problem. They were perfectly happy avoiding each other until their parents set them up to get married. The reluctant couple decide to do whatever it takes to break off the engagement. After some very embarrassing efforts, they finally succeed in getting their parents to call off the wedding, only to realize they have another problem, they're in love! Meanwhile, Saima's father (Asrani), deciding that she's passed her expiration date, promises her to Ashol (Ismail Bashey)- a sleazy playboy. Finally, there's a wedding; Ashol's big secret, Ameet's bigger surprise, and Saima's biggest decision.

Cast 
Sunil Malhotra as Ameet
Lisa Ray as Saima
Asrani as Papa
Kal Penn as Bobby
Purva Bedi as Ruby
Ismail Bashey as Ashol
Johnny Kastl as Monty
Ather Ali as Dev
Brea Cola as Angela
Subash Kundanmal as Ameet's Father
Noor Shic as Ameet's Mother
Ulka Amin as Saima'a Mom
Shaan Puri as Deepy

External links 
 
 

2000s English-language films
2004 romantic comedy films
2004 films
American romantic comedy films
2000s American films